Sophia Anna Bush Hughes (born July 8, 1982) is an American actress and activist. She starred as Brooke Davis in The WB/CW drama series One Tree Hill (2003–2012), and as Erin Lindsay in the NBC police procedural drama series Chicago P.D. (2014–2017). She was a producer for and starred in the lead role of Dr. Samantha "Sam" Griffith in the medical drama Good Sam (2022).

Bush has also appeared in films, including  John Tucker Must Die (2006), The Hitcher (2007), The Narrows (2008), Chalet Girl (2011), Marshall (2017), Acts of Violence (2018), and Incredibles 2 (2018). She is also known for her philanthropy work and social activism, including her work for the Time's Up movement and DoSomething.org.

Early life and education 
Bush was born in Pasadena, California, the only child of Maureen Searson and Charles William Bush. Her mother runs a photography studio, and her father is an advertising and beauty photographer. She graduated from Westridge School for Girls in 2000, where she was a member of the volleyball team. At Westridge, she was required to participate in the theater arts program. Bush stated: "Part of my school's requirement was to do a play. I was really irritated because I wanted to play volleyball and I had to go and do this play. But there was a moment after the performance when I realized I had gone and been somebody else. I thought, 'If I could do this for the rest of my life, I am set.' It was like love at first sight." At age 17, Bush was named the Tournament of Roses Parade Queen.

Career

Bush made her first film appearance in the 2002 film National Lampoon's Van Wilder opposite Ryan Reynolds. Following this, she made appearances in several television shows, including Nip/Tuck, Sabrina the Teenage Witch, and the HBO film Point of Origin. In 2002, Bush was cast as Kate Brewster in Terminator 3: Rise of the Machines, though she was replaced by Claire Danes after a week of filming. Jonathan Mostow, the director of the film, stated that he had replaced her as he felt she was too young for the role, but praised her talent as an actress.

In 2003, Bush was cast as Brooke Davis in the WB television series One Tree Hill. After Bush gained mainstream fame, she became a spokesperson for high-profile brands. She has posed on the cover of several mainstream magazines, including Entertainment Weekly, Lucky, Maxim, Glamour, InStyle, and Zooey Magazine. She has also had several endorsement deals, including for Ocean Pacific clothing. Bush and her One Tree Hill co-stars were endorsers for MasterCard, Kmart, Chevy Cobalt and Cingular Wireless. She directed three episodes of the series, including the penultimate episode of the ninth and final season.

In July 2006, Bush co-starred in the 20th Century Fox comedy film John Tucker Must Die, directed by Betty Thomas, opposite Brittany Snow and Jesse Metcalfe. The film was a commercial success, grossing over $60 million worldwide. That same year, she also starred in Buena Vista Pictures' supernatural thriller Stay Alive alongside Jon Foster, Frankie Muniz, and Adam Goldberg. The film, the first to be released by Hollywood Pictures in five years, opened at number three in the U.S. box office. She played Grace Andrews in the 2007 remake of the classic horror film The Hitcher, starring opposite Sean Bean. In 2008, Bush co-starred alongside Kevin Zegers and Vincent D'Onofrio in François Velle's independent film The Narrows, playing Kathy Popovich. Based on Tim McLoughlin's novel Heart of the Old Country, the film premiered at the Toronto International Film Festival in September 2008.

Three years later, she co-starred in the British romantic comedy film Chalet Girl, which was released in February 2011. In February 2012, it was reported that Bush had joined the cast of the upcoming CBS sitcom Partners. Premiering on September 24, 2012, the series ran for a single season until November, when it was announced that the series had been canceled after six episodes. The remaining seven episodes of the series' initial thirteen-episode order remain unaired in the United States, though they were later aired by various international outlets. In 2013, Bush starred in Passion Pit's "Carried Away" music video, which debuted on February 14. That same year, she was cast in a main role in the television pilot Hatfields & McCoys, but the project failed to be picked up to series.

In August 2013, Bush joined the cast of Chicago P.D. as Det. Erin Lindsay. The series premiered on January 8, 2014. She left the series after four seasons. In December 2018, she cited "abusive behavior" as the reason for leaving the show. Bush also frequently appeared on the first and third Chicago franchise series, Chicago Fire and Chicago Med respectively.

In 2018, Bush provided the voice of Voyd, an aspiring superhero, in Pixar's film, Incredibles 2, the sequel to 2004's The Incredibles.

In 2020, Bush appeared as Veronica in four episodes of the first season of Love, Victor on Hulu. In 2021, she started a podcast with One Tree Hill co-stars, Hilarie Burton and Bethany Joy Lenz, titled Drama Queens.

Personal life 

Bush became engaged to her One Tree Hill co-star Chad Michael Murray in May 2004, and they married on April 16, 2005, in Santa Monica, California. After five months of marriage, Bush and Murray announced their separation in September 2005. In February 2006, Bush filed papers for an annullment, citing fraud. Bush's petition was denied, and she and Murray were instead granted a divorce in December 2006. On her divorce, Bush later said: "It devastates me now that I have been reduced to a Hollywood statistic – another joke marriage. I never expected to be married more than once...because I knew what I was getting into and will always believe in love." In a January 2014 episode of Watch What Happens: Live, she stated: "We were two stupid kids who had no business being in a relationship in the first place. To all the other co-stars who've worked it out, more power to you." She then dated her Stay Alive co-star Jon Foster from 2006 to 2007 and remained friends after the split, citing that the breakup had taught her a valuable lesson about the difference of love and being in love.

Bush's second cousin was nine-year-old Christina Green, who was among those killed in the Tucson shooting rampage in 2011 that left then Rep. Gabrielle Giffords critically wounded. Bush later revealed they had never met but were planning on it as Bush had attended Green's parents wedding.

From 2008 to 2009, Bush dated her One Tree Hill co-star James Lafferty. Bush also dated actor Austin Nichols, confirming in May 2010 that they had been dating on and off for four years. Nichols took the role of Julian Baker on One Tree Hill to be with Bush and she ended their relationship in 2012. Bush began dating Dan Fredinburg, a program manager for Google, in January 2013 to February 2014, citing the strains of their long-distance relationship as the cause of separation. Bush and Fredinburg remained friends afterward, noting that his death in 2015 significantly impacted her. Bush was also in a relationship with her Chicago P.D. co-star Jesse Lee Soffer from 2014 to 2016.

She began dating businessman Grant Hughes in May 2020 and announced their engagement in August 2021 via Instagram. The couple married on June 11, 2022 at Philbrook Museum of Art in Tulsa, Oklahoma.

Activism

Bush uses Twitter, Facebook, Instagram, and her blog to raise awareness of world events and fundraisers in which she takes part. She is a part of fundraisers such as Fuck Cancer, Run for the Gulf, and Global Green Gulf Relief and has been involved in political issues, including her support for Barack Obama's candidacy for president in the 2008 election. In February 2008, she made several appearances in Texas in support of the Obama campaign in the Democratic presidential primary election. Bush was joined in Dallas, Fort Worth, and Waco by fellow actor Adam Rodríguez. Touring mostly college campuses, they urged young voters to get involved politically.

In April 2009, along with stars Sarah Chalke, Jason Lewis, Alicia Silverstone, Jane Lynch, and Lance Bass, Bush appeared in the Funny or Die video "A Gaythering Storm", which parodied a National Organization for Marriage video objecting to same-sex marriage. Bush is a staunch supporter of gay rights and, in May 2009, she showed up at a rally in protest of Proposition 8. She carried a sign stating, "I DO support the freedom to marry", and a shirt which had the words "Legalize Gay" across it. In an interview in January 2012, Bush said about the 2012 Republican candidates: "I will not vote for a candidate who thinks you can 'pray away the gay,' I will not vote for a candidate who thinks that he has more rights to my uterus than I do, I will not vote for a candidate who thinks that it's okay to dump toxic waste in the ocean. I'm afraid for our country that people like this could even be thought of as the president. I live in a country where I believe all men are created equal, not just wealthy white guys. I believe all men, all women, regardless of race, gender, socioeconomic background, you deserve the same rights." In June 2016, the Human Rights Campaign released a video in tribute to the victims of the Orlando nightclub shooting; in the video, Bush and others told the stories of the people killed there.

Bush set up a fundraiser intended to help people living in the area of the Gulf of Mexico affected by the environmental disaster of the Deepwater Horizon oil spill on April 20, 2010. The actress has visited Louisiana and testified in interviews of the horror she felt when she visited those places. The fundraiser is on the Internet through crowdsourcing website Crowdrise.com. The actress, to support the fundraiser, announced that she would be running a half marathon that following November, despite having asthma and a year-old knee injury. Bush has additionally teamed up with Do Something to raise more environmental awareness among teens. She was chosen as the spokesperson to endorse the launch of eMission, a Facebook game with the social mission to engage America's youth in fighting climate change created through the joint efforts of Do Something and U.S. Environmental Protection Agency's (EPA) Energy Star program.

In 2011, Bush won the Do Something Twitter Award for having spread the word via her Twitter account on how her followers could help with the cleanup after the Deepwater Horizon oil spill. She was voted "Fan Favorite" by Facebook users on DoSomething.org. In 2011, Bush also became involved in the Pencils of Promise organization, which builds schools and increases educational opportunities in the developing world. In December 2011, Bush competed with other stars in the Mozilla Firefox Challenge, a one-month fundraising contest whose winner is granted $25,000 to put toward a favorite cause; she won the contest in January 2012. In April 2013, Bush took part in Global Poverty Project's "Live Below the Line" campaign, which consists in living on $1.50 a day to raise awareness of extreme poverty around the world.

In 2013, Bush hosted a Prizeo campaign to raise funds for one of her favorite causes, I Am that Girl. As part of the campaign, Bush offered donors a grand prize of the opportunity to skydive with her. In 2014, Bush's foreword to Alexis Jones' debut novel I Am that Girl was released and distributed by accessories retailer Claire's. In 2016, Bush was named to Oprah's SuperSoul 100 list of visionaries and influential leaders.

Bush is a founding member of the movement Time's Up. Two of her contributions include creating a clothing line benefiting Planned Parenthood and giving a speech at the Women's March on January 20, 2018. Sophia is also constantly using her social media platforms, such as Twitter, encouraging people to participate in the ongoing activism opportunities around the world.

In the 2018 fight over the nomination of Brett Kavanaugh to the Supreme Court, Bush was supportive of Christine Blasey Ford, and praised her strength throughout the controversy. Bush tweeted, "To everyone saying 'why did they wait? The timing feels suspect,' etc. Just remember Bill Cosby. No one wanted to believe it about him. It was true. And he's going to prison. I'd wager more women victimized by Kavanaugh will come forward. Women feel safety in numbers #TimesUp".

In July 2022, Bush and Grant Hughes wrote an essay for Glamour affirming their support of abortion rights in the wake of Roe v Wade being overturned by the Supreme Court. In the piece, Bush wrote,This moment is nothing short of a national emergency. But these days it also feels incredibly personal. Because I type this as I look across the kitchen at my husband. A man with whom I am deeply in love. And a man who might never have come into my life, nor me into his, had it not been for an abortion. Not my experience—I have never had an abortion—but his. An abortion that he and a former partner had is what got us here.

I Am A Voter
In 2018, Bush helped found a nonpartisan movement with Mandana Dayani that aims to create a cultural shift around voting and civic engagement by unifying around a central truth: democracy works best when we all participate. I Am A Voter has partnered with Disney, NBA, NFL, McDonald's, Stuart Weitzman, and Bumble. Their campaign to boost voter registration included participants Debra Messing, Eric McCormack, Sean Hayes, Gwyneth Paltrow, Robert Downey Jr., Jennifer Aniston, Lisa Kudrow, Courteney Cox, Bush, Hilarie Burton, and Bethany Joy Lenz. According to I Am A Voter, the effort generated over one billion digital impressions and 250 media articles upon launch.

Public image 

Bush's appearance has often been the subject of media attention. She was ranked #3 on Femme Fatales: The 50 Sexiest Women of 2004 and named #15 on Much Music's 20 Hottest Women of 2004. In April 2007, she ranked No. 90 in the British popular men's magazine FHM, in their countdown of 100 Sexiest Women of 2007. Subsequently, she ranked No. 89 in the U.S. edition of the same magazine. In May 2007, Bush ranked No. 24 in the Maxim Hot 100 List of 2007. She also appeared on the cover of the November 2006 edition of Maxim with her One Tree Hill co-stars Hilarie Burton and Danneel Harris. She ranked #30 on Maxim's "Hot 100" of 2014 list. She was featured in Peoples "Beautiful at Every Age" and "Most Beautiful" lists for several years.

Bush has been featured in several fashion blogs and magazines, including CosmoGirl, Health, Lucky, Zooey, Saturday Night, Teen People and Bello.

Filmography

Film

Television

Director

Producer

Podcasts

Music videos

Video games

Awards and nominations

References

External links 

 
 
 
 
 
 

1982 births
Living people
21st-century American actresses
Activists from California
Actresses from Pasadena, California
American film actresses
American television actresses
American people of Italian descent
Beauty pageant contestants from California
American LGBT rights activists
USC Annenberg School for Communication and Journalism alumni